HBO Signature is a Southeast Asian pay television network owned by HBO Asia featuring Hollywood blockbuster movies, regardless of genre.

On 1 March 2019, In a preparation for the 8th and final season of Game of Thrones, the channel was temporarily re-branded as HBO Signature Game of Thrones, a dedicated channel that airs past seasons and exclusive behind-the-scene features from the series until 30 April 2019.

Programming
HBO Signature Asia has licensing deals with two major Hollywood conglomerates film studios: Warner Bros. Discovery (Warner Bros. Pictures; New Line Cinema, HBO Films, Castle Rock Entertainment; Warner Independent Pictures, Franchise Pictures) and Paramount Global (Paramount Pictures, Paramount Vantage).

Other channels

References

External links
 Official website

Signature
HBO Signature
HBO Signature
Movie channels in Singapore
Television stations in Singapore
Television channels and stations established in 2005